= 1961 Liechtenstein referendums =

Creating a new tax law
For	66.69%
Against	33.31%

Initiative on the law on land surveying
For	60.92%
Against	39.08%

Initiative on the hunting law
For	51.03%
Against	48.97%

Three referendums were held in Liechtenstein during 1961. The first was held on 12 March on the creation of a new tax law, and was approved by 66.7% of voters. The second was held on 8 August on an initiative on the law on land surveying, and was approved by 60.9% of voters. The third on 8 December was on an initiative on hunting law, and was approved by 51% of voters.

== Results ==
=== New tax law ===
Choice	Votes	%
For	1,952	66.7
Against	975	33.3
Invalid/blank votes	120	–
Total	3,047	100
Registered voters/turnout	3,595	84.8
Source: Nohlen & Stöver

=== Land surveying law initiative ===
Choice	Votes	%
For	1,548	60.9
Against	993	39.1
Invalid/blank votes	159	–
Total	2,700	100
Registered voters/turnout	3,621	74.6
Source: Nohlen & Stöver

=== Hunting law initiative ===
Choice	Votes	%
For	1,416	51.0
Against	1,359	49.0
Invalid/blank votes	136	–
Total	2,911	100
Registered voters/turnout	3,619	80.4
Source: Nohlen & Stöver
